Moonster may refer to:

 Peugeot Moonster, a 2001 French concept car
 "Moonster", a song on Dance Dance Revolution SuperNova

See also
 Monster (disambiguation)
 Moonstar (disambiguation)